"Slow Burning Memory" is a song co-written and recorded by American country music artist Vern Gosdin.  It was released in November 1984 as the third single from his album There Is a Season.  The song peaked at number 10 on the Billboard Hot Country Singles chart.  Gosdin wrote the song with Max D. Barnes.

Chart performance

References

1984 singles
Vern Gosdin songs
Songs written by Max D. Barnes
Songs written by Vern Gosdin
1984 songs